The Women's 100 metre breaststroke SB5 swimming event at the 2004 Summer Paralympics was competed on 24 September. It was won by Kirsten Bruhn, representing .

Final round

24 Sept. 2004, evening session

References

W
2004 in women's swimming